Brickland is a historic plantation house located near Kenbridge, Lunenburg County, Virginia. The original section was built about 1818, with an addition built about 1822, and rear addition in 1920.  It is a -story, eight bay, brick dwelling in the Federal  style.  The front facade features a gable-roof porch with paired Tuscan order columns. Also on the property are the contributing pump house, smokehouse (c. 1820), Lunenburg County's first post office (c. 1900), a summer kitchen (c. 1820), barns, a chicken house, and the ruins of slave quarters and an ice house.

It was listed on the National Register of Historic Places in 2005.

References

Plantation houses in Virginia
Houses on the National Register of Historic Places in Virginia
Federal architecture in Virginia
Houses completed in 1818
Houses in Lunenburg County, Virginia
National Register of Historic Places in Lunenburg County, Virginia
Slave cabins and quarters in the United States